A Methodist Girls' School is a girls' school founded by Methodists.  They include:

 Methodist Girls' School, Ipoh, Malaysia
 Methodist Girls' School, Klang, Malaysia
 Methodist Girls' School, Singapore
 Methodist Girls Senior High School, Ghana

See also 
 MGS (disambiguation)
 Methodist Ladies' College (disambiguation)